The 1952 Liège–Bastogne–Liège was the 38th edition of the Liège–Bastogne–Liège cycle race and was held on 11 May 1952. The race started and finished in Liège. The race was won by Ferdinand Kübler.

General classification

References

1952
1952 in Belgian sport
1952 Challenge Desgrange-Colombo